Keechant L. Sewell (born April 2, 1972) is an American police officer and administrator who is currently serving as the 45th New York City Police Commissioner, the first woman to serve in the position.

Early life
Sewell was raised in the Queens neighborhood of Long Island City, including at the Queensbridge Houses. She later lived in the Queens neighborhoods of Corona and Jamaica.

Career

Nassau County Police Department
In October 1997, Sewell became a police officer assigned to Nassau County Police Department's Fifth Precinct. Sewell was eventually promoted through the ranks to become the commanding officer of the 7th Precinct and then, by 2016, commanding officer of the major case squad. In 2008 Sewell had attended the FBI National Academy, and other assignments included the Professional Standards Bureau, Internal Affairs, and training with the FBI to be the county's chief hostage negotiator. On September 24, 2020, Sewell was promoted to NCPD's chief of detectives, commanding a staff of approximately 350 officers.

Sewell was also member of the New York–New Jersey Joint-Terrorism Task Force.

New York City Police Commissioner
On December 14, 2021, it was announced that Sewell would be appointed as the 45th New York City police commissioner by Mayor-Elect Eric Adams. She became the first female commissioner of the New York Police Department, and its third black commissioner. She oversees 35,000 uniformed officers and 18,000 civilians. On January 1, 2022, Sewell was officially sworn in as first female commissioner of the New York Police Department since it was founded 176 years beforehand.She is the highest ranking woman in NYPD history. Sewell was criticized for publicly accepting the appointment in front of a mural of Assata Shakur, convicted of killing a police officer.

Personal life 
At the time of her appointment as New York City Police Commissioner, Sewell was residing in Valley Stream, New York.

References

Living people
African-American police officers
American women police officers
People from Queens, New York
People from Valley Stream, New York
21st-century African-American women
New York City Police Commissioners
1972 births
FBI National Academy graduates